The Ratu Adil, literally meaning Just Queen/King, is a messianic figure found in Indonesian folklore, more precisely in Javanese tradition. It is believed that he (or she) will establish universal peace and justice in the manner of similar figures, such as King Arthur in European folklore. The Ratu Adil is first mentioned in the Pralembang Joyoboyo, the set of prophecies ascribed to the 12th century King Jayabaya of Kediri. The Ratu Adil is described in Jayabaya's prophecies, also according to the 19th century poet Ranggawarsita; as a figure who has an exceptional ability to lead the country.

Description
The prophecy predicts that in a time of a great peril, the Ratu Adil will come from an unassuming background; either he or she will come from a modest family, poor, and at first unknown.

It is believed that Ratu Adil has exceptional qualities identified as Hastabrata, an eight characteristics symbolized by sun, moon, stars, earth, ocean, wind, fire and water.

In Indonesian history, this belief was highly advantageous to most early nationalist leaders. The prophecy also talks about the decline of the nobility as the established rulers.

History
In Javanese history, there are several examples or episodes that in the time of chaos, injustice, or great peril, a man from unassuming background or unpredicted position, could successfully rise, seized the power, and become the Ratu (Javanese term equate to "King/Queen/Leader"). This historic figures among others includes Airlangga the King of Kahuripan, Ken Angrok, the founder of Rajasa Dynasty of Singhasari, and Raden Wijaya, the founder of Majapahit. They mostly took the role as the dynastic founder.

In the Javanese religious tradition or Kejawen, it is believed that certain events are preordained by the gods, the divine or God almighty. It is believed that in the time of great danger and injustice, a hero will come and restore the sacred order. This is reminiscent of the function of Vishnu's avatars in Hinduism, or Maitreya bodhisatva in Buddhism. After the adoption of the Islamic faith, local tradition took its Islamic counterpart as the Messianic figure of Imam Mahdi. Thus in Javanese perspective, a Ratu Adil is its own version of Messiah or Great Just King that will deliver the people from injustice and restore order in Java or by extension, Nusantara (Indonesian archipelago).

Applications
The mantle of Ratu Adil has been applied to a number of persons in recent Indonesian history, including Prince Diponegoro, Sultan Hamengkubuwono IX, Tjokroaminoto, President Sukarno and Dutch military officer Raymond Westerling.

In 1951-1964 around Paniai Lakes there was a messianic movement called Wege, the members consisted primarily of Ekari people believed of a Ratu Adil figure from Java that will come to bring wealth and found "Kingdom of Happiness". The basis of this movement is of a local folktale of Situgumina, a local figure with the knowledge of life and death and the knowledge of world's treasures, after his travel to the west to Java, and would return again. The leader of this movement was Zacheus Pakage, a local village elder and former preacher that had studied in Kebo, Enarotali, and Kemah Injili Church in Unjungpandang. After which he helped missionaries in Moni, Uhunduni, and Dani. Through these experience he experienced discriminations by Dutch authority toward other missionaries, as he did not received salaries for his service. Members of these movement prepared for the second coming of a Ratu Adil by constructing secret barracks and secluded communities in the forest and participated in ceremonies for weeks and advocated for gotong-royong. Dutch colonial authority would stop this movement in 1954 and sentenced Zacheus Pakage to prison and mental institution. These movement resulted in numerous revolts against Dutch authorities, in 1954 by Agadide community which believed if they killed Dutch local authorities then, they would have to recognized defeat and leave. This along with rumours that white pigs from Dutch authorities caused whooping coughs resulted in escalating tension and lead to Obano uprising in 1956-1957.

Later, a Dutch-Indonesian Pencak Silat pioneer, Rudy Terlinden, gave his pencak silat style the name of Ratu Adil. In his belief, the 
Javanese mythology of Ratu Adil is christened as Jesus Christ.

References

History of Java
Indonesian folklore
Javanese folklore
Javanese mythology